PR is the complexity class of all primitive recursive functions—or, equivalently, the set of all formal languages that can be decided in time bounded by such a function. This includes addition, multiplication, exponentiation, tetration, etc.

The Ackermann function is an example of a function that is not primitive recursive, showing that PR is strictly contained in R (Cooper 2004:88).

On the other hand, we can "enumerate" any recursively enumerable set (see also its complexity class RE) by a primitive-recursive function in the following sense: given an input (M, k), where M is a Turing machine and k is an integer, if M halts within k steps then output M; otherwise output nothing.  Then the union of the outputs, over all possible inputs (M, k), is exactly the set of M that halt.

PR strictly contains ELEMENTARY.

PR does not contain "PR-complete" problems (assuming, e.g., reductions that belong to ELEMENTARY). In practice, many problems that are not in PR but just beyond are -complete (Schmitz 2016).

References

External links 
 .

Complexity classes